The Victorian Premier's Prize for Fiction, formerly known as the Vance Palmer Prize for Fiction, is a prize category in the annual Victorian Premier's Literary Award. As of 2011 it has an remuneration  of 25,000. The winner of this category prize vies with 4 other category winners for overall Victorian Prize for Literature valued at an additional 100,000.

The prize was formerly known as the Vance Palmer Prize for Fiction from inception until 2010, when the awards were re-established under the stewardship of the Wheeler Centre and restarted with new prize amounts and a new name. The Palmer Prize was valued at 30,000 in 2010. The award was named after Vance Palmer, a leading literary critic. Palmer wrote reviews and presented a program called Current Books Worth Reading on ABC Radio. He also wrote books about Australian cultural life, including National Portraits (1940) A.G. Stephens: His Life and Work, (1941) Frank Wilmot (1942), Old Australian bush ballads (co-authored with Margaret Sutherland) (1951) and The Legend of the Nineties (1954). He was appointed in Chairman of the Advisory Board of the Commonwealth Literary Fund in 1947. The Palmer Prize was managed by the State Library of Victoria from 1997 to 2010.

Winners and shortlists 
Winners of the Overall Victorian Prize for Literature have a blue ribbon.

Vance Palmer Prize for Fiction (1985-2010)

Notes

References 

Victorian Premier's Literary Awards
Australian fiction awards
Awards established in 1985